The 2015 Southend-on-Sea Borough Council election took place on 7 May 2015 to elect members of Southend-on-Sea Borough Council in England. This was on the same day as the other local elections.

Summary Result

Ward Results

Belfairs

Blenheim Park

Chalkwell

Eastwood Park

Kursaal

Leigh

Milton

Prittlewell

St. Laurence

St. Luke's

Shoeburyness

Southchurch

Thorpe

Victoria

West Leigh

West Shoebury

Westborough

References

2015 English local elections
May 2015 events in the United Kingdom
2015
2010s in Essex